Mossie Smith is a British actress, best known for Goodnight, Mister Tom (1998), Prime Suspect (1995) and Second Best (1994).

Filmography
Goodnight, Mister Tom (1998)
Prime Suspect (1995)
Second Best (1994)
Resistance (2011)

References

External links
 

Living people
English film actresses
English television actresses
Year of birth missing (living people)